John Stubbs (or Stubbe) (c. 1544 – after 25 September 1589) was an English pamphleteer, political commentator and sketch artist during the Elizabethan era.

He was born in the County of Norfolk, and was educated at Trinity College, Cambridge. After reading law at Lincoln's Inn, he lived at Thelveton, in the County of Norfolk. He was a committed Puritan, and he opposed the negotiations for marriage between Queen Elizabeth I and Francis, Duke of Anjou, a Roman Catholic who was the brother of the King of France.

Publication of French Marriage pamphlet
In 1579 he put his opinions into a pamphlet entitled The Discovery of a Gaping Gulf whereunto England is like to be swallowed by another French Marriage, if the Lord forbid not the banns, by letting her Majesty see the sin and punishment thereof. Copies of the text were later publicly burned in the kitchen stove of Stationer's Hall.  The pamphlet argued that at forty-six years old Elizabeth was too old to have children and therefore had no need for marriage. He argued that English values, customs, language and morality would be undermined by so close a relationship with the French monarchy.

Stubbs argued that his objective was to protect the freedom of thought and free speech that he said was associated with Protestantism. The proposed marriage could lead to a restoration of Catholic orthodoxy with its diminution of liberty.

Stubbs undiplomatically described the proposed wedding as a "contrary coupling," "an immoral union, an uneven yoking of the clean ox to the unclean ass, a thing forbidden in the law" as laid down by St. Paul, a "more foul and more gross" union that would draw the wrath of God on England and leave the English "pressed down with the heavy loins of a worse people and beaten as with scorpions by a more vile nation."

Trial, punishment, and further writing
Elizabeth's court were displeased by the publication. Circulation of this pamphlet was prohibited, and Stubbs, his printer, and publisher were tried at Westminster, found guilty of "seditious writing", and sentenced to have their right hands cut off by means of a cleaver driven through the wrist by a mallet.  Initially Queen Elizabeth had favoured the death penalty but was persuaded by adviser John Jovey to opt for the lesser sentence. The printer was subsequently pardoned by Elizabeth, but in the case of Stubbs and his publisher the sentence was carried out, and Stubbs' right hand was cut off on 3 November 1579. At the time Stubbs protested his loyalty to the Crown, and immediately before the public dismemberment delivered a shocking pun: "Pray for me now my calamity is at hand." His right hand having been cut off, he removed his hat with his left hand and cried "God Save the Queen!" before fainting.

Stubbs was subsequently imprisoned for eighteen months. On being released in 1581 he continued to write, publishing, among other pamphlets, a reply to Cardinal Allen's Defence of the English Catholics. Despite his punishment, he remained a loyal subject of Queen Elizabeth and later served in the House of Commons as MP for Great Yarmouth in the English Parliament of 1589.
 
He died and was buried with military honours on the shore at Le Havre, France, where he seems to have gone to volunteer for military service (despite the disability caused by his punishment) under Henry of Navarre. His will, dated 25 September 1589, was probated on 27 June 1590.

Marriage and issue
John Stubbs married Anne de Vere (d. 1617), widow of Christopher Shernborne (d. 7 July 1575), and daughter of Aubrey de Vere, second son of John de Vere, 15th Earl of Oxford. By her marriage to Christopher Shernborne, Anne had a son, Francis Shernborne, esquire, who was the last of the male line to bear the surname. Francis Shernborne married Martha Colt, said to have been the daughter of Sir George Colt of Cavendish, Suffolk, by whom he had a daughter and heir, Mary Colt, who married Sir Augustine Sotherton of Taverham, near Norwich.

Stubbs was brother-in-law of the noted Puritan divine Thomas Cartwright, who married his sister Alice. Anne Stubbs, John's wife, was a Brownist.

Modern research on Stubbs
Linda Gregerson of the University of Michigan  a book, Commonwealth of the Word:  Nation and Reformation in Early Modern England, that closely examines Stubbs' life and the contradictions of his loyalty to the Crown in light of his punishment, as well as the role of nationalism, patriotism and religion in shaping his beliefs.

References

Bibliography

Attribution
 

1540s births
1591 deaths
People from Thelveton
Alumni of Trinity College, Cambridge
16th-century English writers
16th-century male writers
16th-century Puritans
English pamphleteers
English male writers